The long-tail boat, is a type of watercraft native to Southeast Asia, which uses a common automotive engine as a readily available and maintainable powerplant. A craft designed to carry passengers on a river may include a lightweight long canoe hull, up to 30 metres, and a canopy. There is much variation among these boats, some have evolved from traditional craft types, while others have a more improvised look—the sole defining characteristic is a second-hand car or truck engine.

Long-tail boats are now often used to transport tourists. There are also competitions involving long-tail boats in some provinces of Thailand.

History
The long-tail boat, also known as "Ruea Hang Yao" in Thai, is a type of watercraft that originated in Thailand in the early 20th century. The first long-tail boat was created by Sanong Thitibura in Sing Buri province, Thailand, in the 1930s. Thitibura, who worked as a helmsman for the Royal family, developed the long-tail boat by mounting an engine on a rowing boat and extending the shaft to create a long propeller. Since then, the long-tail boat has been further developed by other boat builders in Thailand, including Sucheep Ratsarn, Chanchai Phairatkhun, Sukhum Chirawanit, and Samai Kittikhun. Today, the long-tail boat is a popular and iconic form of transportation and fishing boat, often used to transport passengers and tourists, and employed as sightseeing boats in coastal areas.

Propulsion 

The engine is invariably mounted on an inboard turret-like pole which can rotate through 180 degrees, allowing steering by thrust vectoring. The propeller is mounted directly on the driveshaft with no additional gearing or transmission. Usually the engine also swivels up and down to provide a "neutral gear" where the propeller does not contact the water. The driveshaft must be extended by several metres of metal rod to properly position the propeller, giving the boat its name and distinct appearance.

Advantages to the inboard engine with a long driveshaft include keeping the engine relatively dry. Following the basic design pattern allows a variety of engines to be attached to a variety of different kinds of hulls. This flexibility simplifies construction and maintenance while sacrificing the efficiency and comfort that might be expected of a typical mass-produced product.

Engine cooling is provided by a metal pipe underneath the rear running board which is used as a rudimentary heat-exchanger. This is then coupled to the engine using rubber or plastic hoses. Clean water is then used as the coolant.

Control is achieved by moving the engine with a lever attached to the inboard side. Ignition and throttle controls provide simple means to control the craft. Larger boats may include more than one "tail," with several operators piloting in tandem.

Costs
Thailand's most distinctive form of coastal transport is in danger of becoming obsolete. In 1989, the Thai government banned logging of natural forests. This led to a shortage of timber used in boat making, and required the wood to be imported from other countries. With a recent increase in the cost of imported timber, there has been a drastic decline in the number of new boats constructed, which has caused the price of an individual boat to skyrocket. A few years ago, a long-tail boat cost about 3,000 baht (US$83). Now, according to Chot, a local long-tail boat captain on Ko Samui, Thailand, a boat costs almost 70 times as much. "Now, it's over 200,000 baht (US$5,500). That's 200,000 only for the hull of a new boat," Chot said, "not including the engine." As a consequence, long-tails are sharing the water with an increasing number of speedboats. Speedboats hold more people and they travel faster, tempting some guides to switch from longtails to speedboats.

See also

References

Sources

External links

Mast & Sail in Europe & Asia: Chapter 11

Boat types
Ships of Thailand